Dao is a surname in Canada, India, the Philippines, Hong Kong, mainland China, Singapore, the UK, Portugal, the US and Vietnam

Persons with the surname
 Đào Duy Từ, a 17th-century poet
 Đào Văn Phong, a soccer player
 Julie C. Dao, Vietnamese-American author
 Chloe Dao, American fashion designer and winner of the second season of reality TV show Project Runway.

References